Bohai University, established in 1950, is a university in Jinzhou, Liaoning province, northeast China.

History
The current name Bohai University is used after the merge of Jinzhou Normal College and Liaoning Commercial College in 2003. Jinzhou Normal College was established in 1950 with the aim to train teachers in Jinzhou and nearby cities. Liaoning Commercial College was founded the next year to provide commercial talents to support the building of the business industry in Liaoning Province.

Academics
Bohai University is a comprehensive educator that provides comprehensive education to undergraduate degree, graduate degree, and diploma seekers. It has 20 colleges that offer bachelor’s and master’s degree education in 
literature
politics and history
mathematics and physics
chemistry, chemical engineering and food Safety
college of information science and technology (software and service outsourcing)
engineering
economy and law
management
tourism
foreign languages
education and P.E.
arts and communications
international exchange (South Korea)
Marxism
new energy
finance, commerce and trade
advanced vocation and technology (maritime and applied technology)
adult education
training
liberal arts and science

Tradition and culture
Due to its location and background, Bohai University has devoted effort to the research of the demographic condition, cultural history and natural environment of west Liaoning Province. In April 2013, Bohai University established four new research centers: Center of Humane History and Environmental Change of West Liaoning, Institute of World Sea Power, Institute of Network Political Studies, and Institute for Society and Livelihood.

International exchange
Bohai University has established international collaboration with 32 universities and educational institutes in United States, Germany, Britain, Japan, Korea, Australia and Russia. Bohai University is also actively developing collaboration with Taiwan education community.

Recent awards
Students from Bohai University have frequently won awards in national contests. In the Eighth Bi Sheng Cup National Electronic Innovative Design Contest Finals in June 2013, students from College of Engineering won the first place of this famous event. In the National College Computer Design Contest in August 2013, students from College of Management won the second place out of 156 final teams from universities around China. In the selection event for the 9th Alcamo International Vocal Contest, students from College of Arts and Communications won Excellence Award and were allowed entry to the world-renowned competition.

References

External links
 

Universities and colleges in Liaoning
Educational institutions established in 1950
1950 establishments in China